

Best Fest is a compilation album by the a cappella group Rockapella. It is first of three Japan-only compilation albums of the group's recordings, featuring a mix of tracks from previous Japanese albums, as well as two new songs that were not previously available. It was marketed as a "greatest hits" album; a "hit" in Japan is a song that has been used in a Japanese television commercial, of which Rockapella had many. As an incentive to get fans to buy it, the album includes two previously unreleased songs, "Tornado Man" and "Always You", and separate track versions of the "Logo" songs, the different versions of the "Rockapella jingle" the group does at the beginning of each of their first five CDs.

Track listing

Personnel
Scott Leonard – high tenor
Sean Altman – tenor
Elliot Kerman – baritone
Barry Carl – bass
Jeff Thacher – vocal percussion

Special Appearances
Jaci Carl – "Fat Jack & Bonefish Joe"
Jesse Leonard – "I Know Christmas"
David Yazbek – vocal percussion – "I Like You Very Much"

References

Rockapella albums
1995 compilation albums